Eunidia transversefasciata is a species of beetle in the family Cerambycidae. It was described by Stephan von Breuning and Jong in 1941.

References

Eunidiini
Beetles described in 1941